Jean, Baron Bourgain (– ) was a Belgian mathematician. He was awarded the Fields Medal in 1994 in recognition of his work on several core topics of mathematical analysis such as the geometry of Banach spaces, harmonic analysis, ergodic theory and nonlinear partial differential equations from mathematical physics.

Biography
Bourgain received his PhD from the Vrije Universiteit Brussel in 1977. He was a faculty member at the University of Illinois, Urbana-Champaign and, from 1985 until 1995, professor at Institut des Hautes Études Scientifiques at Bures-sur-Yvette in France, at the Institute for Advanced Study in Princeton, New Jersey from 1994 until 2018. He was an editor for the Annals of Mathematics. From 2012 to 2014, he was a visiting scholar at UC Berkeley.

His research work included several areas of mathematical analysis such as the geometry of Banach spaces, harmonic analysis, analytic number theory, combinatorics, ergodic theory, partial differential equations and spectral theory, and later also group theory. In 2000, Bourgain connected the Kakeya problem to arithmetic combinatorics. As a researcher, he was the author or coauthor of more than 500 articles.

Bourgain was diagnosed with pancreatic cancer in late 2014.  He died of it on 22 December 2018 at a hospital in Bonheiden, Belgium.

Awards and recognition 
Bourgain received several awards during his career, the most notable being the Fields Medal in 1994.

In 2009 Bourgain was elected a foreign member of the Royal Swedish Academy of Sciences.

In 2010, he received the Shaw Prize in Mathematics.

In 2012, he and Terence Tao received the Crafoord Prize in Mathematics from the Royal Swedish Academy of Sciences.

In 2015, he was made a baron by king Philippe of Belgium.

In 2016, he received the 2017 Breakthrough Prize in Mathematics.

In 2017, he received the 2018 Leroy P. Steele Prizes.

Selected publications

Articles
  (See Banach space and martingale.)
 
 
 
 
 
 
 
 
 
  (See Sobolev space.)
 
 
 
  (See Lindelöf hypothesis.)

Books
 
 
  (Bourgain's research on nonlinear dispersive equations was, according to Carlos Kenig, "deep and influential".)

References

External links
MathSciNet: "Items authored by Bourgain, Jean."

 
 
 
 
 
 
 
 

1954 births
2018 deaths
Fields Medalists
Members of the French Academy of Sciences
Members of the Royal Swedish Academy of Sciences
Foreign associates of the National Academy of Sciences
Functional analysts
Mathematical analysts
Institute for Advanced Study faculty
University of Illinois Urbana-Champaign faculty
20th-century Belgian mathematicians
Belgian mathematicians
Vrije Universiteit Brussel alumni